Encyclopedia Brunoniana is an American reference work by Martha Mitchell covering Brown University. Published in 1993 by the Brown University Library, the encyclopedia has 629 pages. A digital version can be read free of charge on the Internet. Mitchell was the university's longtime archivist and "unofficial historian" until she retired in 2003; she died in 2011.

Encyclopedia Brunoniana serves as a reference for the Brown community on the university's history. It includes articles on Brown's departments, publications, buildings, and people associated with the university.

References

External links
Text of Encyclopedia Brunoniana

Brown University
American encyclopedias
Specialized encyclopedias